Interstate 64 (I-64) is an east–west Interstate Highway in the Eastern United States. Its western terminus is at I-70, U.S. Route 40 (US 40), and US 61 in Wentzville, Missouri. Its eastern terminus is at an interchange with I-264 and I-664 at Bower's Hill in Chesapeake, Virginia. I-64 connects the major metropolitan areas of St. Louis, Missouri; Louisville and Lexington in Kentucky; Charleston, West Virginia; and Richmond and Hampton Roads in Virginia.

Route description 

|-
|MO || 
|-
|IL || 
|-
|IN || 
|-
|KY || 
|-
|WV || 
|-
|VA || 
|-
|Total || 
|}

I-64 has concurrencies with I-55, I-57, I-75, I-77, I-81, and I-95. I-64 does not maintain exit number continuity for any of the overlaps, as each of the six north–south routes maintain their exit numbering on their respective overlaps with I-64. Of all the overlaps, I-64 only goes northeast and southwest with I-55 and I-81, while going southeast and northwest with the other interstates.

Missouri 

In Missouri, the stretch was originally labeled as the Daniel Boone Expressway then only as US 40, and, as such, is still known to some locals in the St. Louis area as Highway 40, even though the road has been designated as both I-64 and US 40 since 1988. This road is also the southernmost portion of the Avenue of the Saints. An interchange at Highway N in O'Fallon opened on December 13, 2004. This interchange also accommodates the tie-in of the Route 364 freeway to I-64. In April 2007, construction started to rebuild  of I-64 in St. Louis from Spoede Road to Kingshighway. This project included repaving the entire road, rebuilding the overpasses and interchanges, adding a fourth lane between Spoede Road and I-170, and connecting I-64 to I-170 in all directions. Construction resulted in the complete closure of portions of the expressway in 2008 and 2009. In 2008, I-64 was closed from I-270 to I-170, reopening December 15, 2008. Beginning December 15, 2008, I-64 from I-170 to Kingshighway was closed. On December 6, 2009, with a grand opening ceremony and dedication, I-64 was completed in its entire length in Missouri from the Poplar Street Bridge to I-70 in Wentzville. As of December 7, 2009, I-64 is now complete and signed all the way to I-70 in Wentzville. All stoplights have been removed. The portion of I-64 in St. Louis has been named the Jack Buck Memorial Highway, in honor of the late sportscaster.

Illinois 

I-64 enters Illinois from St. Louis, Missouri, via the Poplar Street Bridge, where it overlaps I-55 as it crosses the Mississippi River. After crossing the city of East St. Louis and the rest of suburban St. Clair County, the freeway heads southeast through rural Southern Illinois. Shortly after passing MidAmerica Airport at exit 23, I-64 enters Clinton County, then Washington County. East of Mount Vernon in Illinois, services along I-64 are slim to none. It is an almost completely flat and empty freeway, crossing Jefferson, Wayne, and White counties as it progresses east toward Indiana and the Evansville, Indiana, area. East of the St. Louis area, there are numerous oil wells dotting the landscape.

The section from Illinois Route 127 (IL 127) to I-57 opened on October 4, 1974. The section from IL 161 to IL 127 opened in December 1973. The section in the Metro East, except for a short section near I-55/I-70, opened on December 23, 1975. The section from US 460 (later IL 142) to US 45 opened on August 7, 1975.

Indiana 

I-64 crosses the Wabash River and enters the state of Indiana. It passes Griffin (State Road 69 (SR 69); exit 4) and Poseyville (SR 165; exit 12) and also passes under nearby SR 68 (no direct interchange serves SR 68, though one can access said route from either SR 165 or SR 65). The Interstate then passes three officially marked exits for Evansville (SR 65, US 41, and I-69 (formerly designated as I-164)) then proceeds through part of the scenic Hoosier National Forest, with exits leading to Dale and Huntingburg (US 231; exit 57); Santa Claus and Ferdinand (SR 162; exit 63); French Lick and Tell City (SR 37; exit 79); and Indiana's first state capital, Corydon (SR 135; exit 105).

Near milepost 61, there is a time change from Central Time Zone (Spencer County) to Eastern Time Zone (Dubois County). Between mileposts 60 and 80, I-64 crosses the Central/Eastern time zone boundary five times. As with all time zone changes on highways maintained by the Indiana Department of Transportation (INDOT), these changes in time zone are not marked with any roadside signage.

Between Evansville and New Albany, I-64 intersects a few major north–south arterial highways, such as US 231, SR 37, and SR 135 and offers access to I-65 to Indianapolis via I-265 before crossing into Kentucky on the Sherman Minton Bridge.

The  route in Indiana can be described as being somewhat winding, especially the farther east one travels within the state.

Kentucky 

I-64 enters Kentucky at Louisville, paralleling the Ohio River along the Riverfront Expressway. It intersects with several downtown interchanges before coming to the Kennedy Interchange, where it intersects I-65 and I-71 in a tangle of ramps often referred to as the "Spaghetti Junction". Moving eastward, I-64 passes through Shelbyville, Frankfort, Midway, Lexington, Winchester, Mount Sterling, Owingsville, and Morehead, before leaving the state near Ashland at Catlettsburg. It overlaps I-75 as it makes an arc around the northeast of Lexington's urban core, with the exit numbers for I-75 used for the concurrent portion. The two Interstates separate a few miles east of downtown Lexington.

West Virginia 

I-64 travels for  within the state of West Virginia, passing by the major cities of Huntington, Beckley, and Lewisburg and directly through the capital city of Charleston. It has only two major junctions within the state: I-77 in Charleston and in Beckley.

Between I-64's two junctions with I-77, I-64 and I-77 overlap. From the final crossing of the Kanawha River east of Charleston to their split at exit 40 south of Beckley, the two Interstates are tolled, forming a part of the West Virginia Turnpike.

While the two expressways overlap, the exit signs are those for I-77. Thus, eastbound travelers entering from Kentucky will see exit numbers increase until exit 60, at which time I-77's exit numbers are used, decreasing from exit 100.

Virginia 

I-64 in Virginia runs east–west through central Virginia from West Virginia via Covington, Lexington, Staunton, and Charlottesville to Richmond. From Lexington to Staunton, it overlaps I-81 (using I-81 exit numbers). In Richmond, it overlaps I-95. From Richmond, I-64 continues southeasterly through Newport News and Hampton to the Hampton Roads Bridge–Tunnel and then through Norfolk and a small portion of Virginia Beach to end in Chesapeake.

I-64 itself does not reach the Oceanfront area of Virginia Beach, as it continues through the western portion of Virginia Beach as part of the circumferential Hampton Roads Beltway. At its terminus, eastbound I-64 runs over  westbound (and westbound I-64 eastbound) as the route forms a fishhook around Norfolk. I-264 intersects the beltway, providing access to other parts of Norfolk and Chesapeake and extending east to the Oceanfront.

Access to the Oceanfront area is accomplished from I-64 via a portion of I-264, a roadway originally built as the Virginia Beach Expressway, funded by tolls to retire revenue bonds.

History 
Elements of I-64, such as the Sherman Minton bridge over the Ohio River on the Indiana–Kentucky border, were completed by the early 1960s. The Interstate was complete between St. Louis and Charleston with the completion of the 9th Street overpass in Louisville in December 1976.

In Virginia, the proposed southern route between Clifton Forge and Richmond called for the Interstate to follow from Richmond via US 360 and US 460, via Lynchburg to Roanoke and US 220 from Roanoke to Clifton Forge, then west following US 60 into West Virginia. The initial 1957 recommendation by a state-retained engineering consultant was for the northern route, but, due in large part to the efforts of a Virginia Senator Mosby G. Perrow Jr. from Lynchburg, the state changed the location to the southern route in 1959. Despite assurances from the federal government that the route would be decided by the state, Virginia's 1959 decision was overturned in favor of the northern route through Charlottesville.

I-64 had a proposed routing around the US 50 corridor in Illinois when the Interstates were first planned. Local pressure pushed the routing closer to the US 460 corridor because of the cheaper cost and shorter mileage compared to the original routing, but not before construction was started on a short section that is now US 50 between Vincennes, Indiana, and Lawrenceville, Illinois. It is also worth noting that the apparent route of I-64 would have taken it through the southern end of Carlyle Lake which was also under construction at this time.

I-64 signs started going up in August 1987 on the US 40 freeway in St. Louis. This change was made in part due to truck drivers deliberately using US 40 to avoid mandatory fines for overweight trucks.

On September 9, 2011, the Sherman Minton Bridge was closed down by Indiana governor Mitch Daniels after construction crews found cracks in the main load bearing structural element. Mainline traffic was redirected to I-265, then south on I-65 across the John F. Kennedy Memorial Bridge before rejoining I-64 at the Kennedy Interchange in Louisville. Repairs were completed in a few months later, and the Sherman Minton Bridge reopened at 11:50 pm on February 17, 2012.

Junction list 
Missouri
  in Wentzville. I-64/US 40 travels concurrently to East St. Louis, Illinois. I-64/US 61 travels concurrently to the Frontenac–Ladue city line.
  in Town and Country
  on the Frontenac–Ladue city line
  in Richmond Heights
  in St. Louis. I-55/I-64 travels concurrently to East, St. Louis, Illinois.
Illinois
  in East St. Louis
  in Caseyville. I-64/US 50 travels concurrently to O'Fallon.
  in Richview
  in Mount Vernon. The highways travel concurrently to south-southwest of Mount Vernon.
  north of Mill Shoals
Indiana
  west-southwest of Warrenton
  west-northwest of Elberfeld. Former Junction of Interstate 164
  in Dale
  west of New Albany. The highways travel concurrently to Louisville, Kentucky.
  in New Albany
Kentucky
  in Louisville
  in Louisville
  in Louisville
  in Louisville
  in Louisville
  on the Middletown–Louisville city line
  in Frankfort
  southeast of Frankfort
  northwest of Lexington
  in Lexington. The highways travel concurrently through Lexington.
  in Lexington
  northeast of Winchester
  in Mt. Sterling
  northeast of Mt. Sterling
  east-southeast of Owingsville
  northeast of Olive Hill
  in Coalton
  south-southwest of Catlettsburg
West Virginia
  in Kenova. The highways travel concurrently to Huntington.
  in Barboursville
  in Teays Valley
  in South Charleston
  in Charleston. The highways travel concurrently through Charleston.
  in Charleston
  in Charleston. The highways travel concurrently to southeast of Crab Orchard.
  north of Chelyan
  south-southeast of Crawley
  in Lewisburg
  east of White Sulphur Springs
  east-southeast of White Sulphur Springs. The highways travel concurrently to Callaghan, Virginia.
Virginia
  in Mallow. I-64/US 60 travels concurrently to north-northwest of Lexington. I-64/US 220 travels concurrently to east-northeast of Clifton Forge.
  in East Lexington
  east of East Lexington. The highways travel concurrently to Jolivue.
  northeast of East Lexington
  in Greenville
  in Waynesboro
  in Rockfish Gap
  in Yancey Mills
  west-southwest of Charlottesville
  east-southeast of Charlottesville
  north-northeast of Zion Crossroads
  northeast of Gum Spring
  in Short Pump
  in Innsbrook
  in Dumbarton
  in Dumbarton
  in Richmond
  in Richmond. The highways travel concurrently through Richmond.
  in Richmond
  on the boundary of Richmond with East Highland Park
  east of Sandston
  in Newport News
  in Hampton
  in Hampton
  in Hampton. The highways travel concurrently to Norfolk
  in Norfolk
  in Norfolk
  in Norfolk
  in Chesapeake. I-64/US 17 travels concurrently through Chesapeake.
  in Chesapeake
  in Chesapeake

Auxiliary routes 

—Former spur to Evansville, Indiana, known as the Robert D. Orr Highway, became I-69 in 2014.
—Loop around Louisville, Kentucky; also called the Georgia Davis Powers/Shawnee Expressway west of the Dixie Highway (US 31W) exit and the Watterson Expressway east of US 31W/Dixie Highway

References

External links 

 Indiana Highway Ends: I-64
 Illinois Highway Ends: I-64
 Interview with MODOT's Linda Wilson and Dan Galvin public information manager for The design/build contractor Gateway Constructors

 
64
64